Stanley station is a train station in Stanley, North Dakota served by Amtrak's Empire Builder line. The platform, tracks, and wooden depot are owned by BNSF Railway. It was originally a Great Northern Railway station that was a replacement for an earlier one, which is now a private residence.

Station layout

Bibliography

Notes and references

External links

Stanley Amtrak Station (USA Rail Guide – Train Web)

Amtrak stations in North Dakota
Former Great Northern Railway (U.S.) stations
Buildings and structures in Mountrail County, North Dakota